Marchena is a genus of jumping spiders only found in the United States. Its only described species, M. minuta, dwells on the barks of conifers along the west coast, especially California, Washington and Nevada.

It forms a monophyletic group with the genera Afraflacilla, Pseudicius and Festucula.

Description
This species can easily be distinguished from others in its range by the tubercles on the first femur of its first legs. M. minuta has a body length of about 4 mm.

Name
The genus name is probably derived from the Spanish city of Marchena, Seville. As witnessed by other generic names, the describers had a habit of naming taxa after places unrelated to the species' distribution. The species name is Latin for "small, minute".

Notes

References
  (2002): Salticidae (Arachnida: Araneae) from Oriental, Australian and Pacific Regions, XVI. New Species of Grayenulla and Afraflacilla. Records of the Australian Museum 54: 269-274. PDF
  (2009): The world spider catalog, version 9.5. American Museum of Natural History.

External links
 Awesome Spiders: Photographs of female and male
 Salticidae.org: Diagnostic drawings and distribution map of M. minuta

Salticidae
Spiders of the United States
Monotypic Salticidae genera